Art Dubai is a leading international art fair that takes place every March in Dubai. Founded in 2007, Art Dubai is the pre-eminent platform for art from the Middle East, North Africa and South Asia. Each year, the fair features a globally diverse lineup of over 90 galleries from more than 40 different countries, from household names to emerging art spaces, making it the world's most globally diverse art fair.

Art Dubai is one of the major events on the international arts calendar, attracting over 30,000 visitors in 2019, including UAE-based, regional and international collectors, curators, patrons, and nearly 100 visiting museums and institutions. Alongside its gallery halls, Art Dubai's extensive programming includes commissioned artists’ and curators’ projects, residencies, education initiatives and the Global Art Forum.

Art Dubai is held under the patronage of Sheikh Mohammed bin Rashid Al Maktoum, Vice President and Prime Minister of the UAE and Ruler of Dubai.

The 2020 edition of Art Dubai went digital due to the COVID-19 Pandemic. The 15th edition of Art Dubai will take place in March 2022.

Galleries

Art Dubai Contemporary 

Art Dubai's gallery halls are split into four main sections: Contemporary, Modern, Bawwaba and Residents. Art Dubai Contemporary features commercial galleries operating on the primary market that have been established for at least two years. Around 60 galleries are selected every year for Art Dubai Contemporary, from established galleries to younger art spaces from under-represented art capitals. Likewise, exhibited artists range from emerging practitioners to industry heavyweights. The works presented at the fair cover painting, drawing, sculpture, installation, video, photography and performance. At the 2019 edition of Art Dubai, more than 90 galleries from over 40 countries were featured, including newcomers from Cameroon and Colombia.

Art Dubai Contemporary's Selection Committee includes Priyanka Raja (Experimenter, Kolkata), Isabelle van den Eynde (Gallery Isabelle van den Eynde, Dubai), Andrée Sfeir-Semler (Sfeir-Semler Gallery, Hamburg/Beirut) and Ursula Krinzinger (Galerie Krinzinger, Vienna).

Art Dubai Modern 

Art Dubai Modern, established in 2014, is devoted to modern art from the Middle East, Africa and South Asia. Each exhibitor presents a solo, two-person or multi-artist show, featuring works by modern art masters of the 20th century, with a focus on work produced between the 1940s and 1980s. In the 2019 edition of the fair, Art Dubai Modern moved into one of the two main Contemporary halls, allowing for a better reading of the region's art history and contextualization of the Contemporary works on show.

Art Dubai Modern's Advisory Committee is composed of Dr Nada Shabout, professor of Art History and the Coordinator of the Contemporary Arab and Muslim Cultural Studies Initiative (CAMCSI) at the University of North Texas; Dr Iftikhar Dadi, associate professor in Cornell University's Department of History of Art and Chair of its Department of Art; Catherine David, Deputy Director of Musée National d'Art Moderne, Paris; and Vali Mahlouji, curator, director of the Kaveh Golestan Estate, independent advisor to the British Museum and founder of the curatorial think tank Archaeology of the Final Decade.

Residents 

Art Dubai presented its first edition of Residents, a four-week residency programme hosted by the fair, in March 2018. Through this programme-cum-gallery section, multidisciplinary gallery artists from all over the world are invited to the UAE to create new works, in fully equipped Dubai and Abu Dhabi studio spaces, inspired by their experiences in the UAE. The artists' selection of works are displayed in a special exhibition area at the fair. The 2019 edition of Residents focused exclusively on Latin America.

Bawwaba 

Art Dubai 2019 saw the launch of Bawwaba, a unique gallery section, located within the main gallery halls. The section featured projects by individual artists or galleries, located in or focused on the Middle East, Africa, Central and South Asia as well as Latin America.

The inaugural edition of Bawwaba was curated by French-Cameroonian curator Élise Atangana, and focused on highly conceptual works including videos, installations and murals. The section aims to give visitors a curated reading of the Global South, acting, as its name suggests, as a gateway to current artistic developments from these regions.

The Global Art Forum 
The Global Art Forum is the largest annual arts conference in the Middle East and Asia and takes place every year at Art Dubai. The conference features live talks, panel discussions and performances by regional and international thought leaders, artists, curators and writers. Previous speakers include high-profile figures such as Hans Ulrich Obrist, Michael Stipe and Christo. In 2018, the Global Art Forum was co-directed by Noah Raford and Marlies Wirth with Commissioner Shumon Basar and held under the title 'I Am Not a Robot', focusing on the timely theme of power, paranoia and potentials of automation. The 2019 iteration of Global Art Forum, on the theme "The School is a Factory?", was organized by Commissioner Shumon Basar, with Victoria Camblin and Fawz Kabra as co-directors.

Education 
Art Dubai's non-for-profit educational programming, provides programmes for children through to post-graduates. Art Dubai's education initiatives include Campus Art Dubai, a community art school for UAE-based artists, curators, writers, designers and enthusiasts, and Forum Fellows, a fellowship that brings together young curators and writers from the Middle East. The fair also has an internship and volunteer programme.

Art Dubai Portraits 
In Spring 2017, the fair started producing Art Dubai Portraits, a series of one- and three-minute films focusing on artists that are connected to the fair through its programming and participating galleries. Unique in showing the artists’ personal- and work-spaces as well as capturing their personality, the Art Dubai Portraits serve as a one-of-a-kind resource for curators and researchers working on the art from the region.

Economic impact 
In March 2016, the fairs’ parent company, Art Dubai Fair FZ LLC (The Art Dubai Group), released the results of an independent survey for Art Week 2015 (March 18–25, 2015). The results show that the total economic impact the Art Dubai and Design Days Dubai events have on the local economy and service sector totaled US$35 million across seven days.

References

External links
 Art Dubai Website
 Art Exhibitions and Events Dubai

2007 establishments in the United Arab Emirates
Annual fairs
Arab art scene
Art fairs
Culture in Dubai
Emirati art
Fairs in the United Arab Emirates
March events
Recurring events established in 2007
Spring (season) events in the United Arab Emirates